This is a list of Maya Rata monarchs. Maya Rata, also known as the Kingdom of Kelaniya, was a medieval era Sinhalese kingdom located in Western part of Sri Lanka.

Maya Rata

Maya Rata (205 BC–161 BC)

M